The 2013–14 season was the ninth season of the current professional domestic soccer competition in Australia.

2013 was the inaugural season of the National Premier Leagues, with five member federations participating.

Domestic leagues

A-League

The 2013–14 A-League regular season began on 11 October 2013 and ended on 13 April 2014.

W-League

The 2013–14 W-League regular season began on 9 November 2013 and ended on 9 February 2014.

National Premier Leagues

2013 was the inaugural season of the National Premier Leagues with five member federations participating.  The 2013 National Premier Leagues regular season in the states' leagues ran from 22 February 2013 until 1 September 2013 and the states' finals series ran from 24 August 2013 until 21 September 2013.

The National Finals series began on 29 September 2013 and ended with the Grand Final on 13 October 2013.

National Youth League

The 2013–14 season of the National Youth League (NYL) ran between 26 October 2013 – 2 March 2014.

International club competitions

AFC Champions League

Western Sydney Wanderers and Central Coast Mariners both entered the competition directly into the group stage, being drawn to Groups H and F respectively. Melbourne Victory entered the competition at Round 3 of the qualifying play-off, and beat Muangthong United 2–1 and were drawn to Group G.

Central Coast Mariners finished the group stage at the bottom of the group, accumulating two wins (against Sanfrecce Hiroshima and Beijing Guoan) and four losses (against Beijing Guoan, Sanfreece Hiroshima and twice against group winner FC Seoul).

Melbourne Victory finished the group stage in the 3rd place, accumulating two wins (against Yokohama F. Marinos and defending champions Guangzhou Evergrande), two draws (both against Jeonbuk Hyundai Motors) and two losses (against Guangzhou Evergrande and Yokohoma F. Marinos).

Western Sydney Wanderers advanced from the group in the first place placing above Kawasaki Frontale based on overall goal difference. They recorded four wins (against Kawasaki Frontale, Ulsan Hyundai and twice against Guizhou Renhe) and two losses (against Ulsan Hyundai and Kawasaki Frontale). In the knock-out stage Round of 16 against Sanfrecce Hiroshima they lost the first leg 3–1, but then managed to win the second leg at home 2–0 and advanced with the away goals rule. They drew defending champions Guangzhou Evergrand for the quarter-finals.

Western Sydney Wanderers faced defending champions Guangzhou Evergrande from China in the quarter-finals and advanced again on the away goals rule with a 2–2 score line over two legs. They faced South Korean FC Seoul in the semi-finals, drawing the first leg 0–0, but then managed to win 2–0 in the second leg at Parramatta Stadium. Wanderers went on to win the Champions League 1–0 on aggregate defeating Saudi Arabian club Al-Hilal with a 1–0 win in the 1st leg, and a 0–0 draw in the second leg in the final.

International Women's Club Championship

The W-League was represented in the second edition of the International Women's Club Championship, known for sponsorship reasons as the Mobcast Cup.

Sydney FC (the winners of the 2012–13 season) participated in the tournament, which took place from 30 November until 8 December 2013, and finished in third place (out of 5 teams).

National teams

Men's senior

Friendlies

EAFF East Asian Cup

FIFA World Cup

Men's under 23

AFC U-22 Championship

Men's under 20

Friendlies

AFC U-19 Championship qualification

Men's under 17

AFF U-16 Youth Championship

AFC U-16 Championship qualification

Women's senior

Friendlies

Cyprus Cup

AFC Women's Asian Cup

Women's under 20

Friendlies

AFF Women's Championship

AFC U-19 Women's Championship

Women's under 17

Friendlies

AFC U-16 Women's Championship

References

External links
 Football Federation Australia official website

 
 
2013–14 in Australian women's soccer
Seasons in Australian soccer